Halmstad Hundred was a hundred in Halland, Sweden. 

It was composed of Getinge, Harplinge, Holm, Kvibille, Rävinge, Slättåkra, Steninge, Söndrum, Vapnö and Övraby parishes, all currently in Halmstad Municipality, as well as Kinnared and Torup parishes in Hylte Municipality.

References

Hundreds of Halland